Operation Tân ("fire") was the name of a series of police raids in Wales between 1 October 1979 and 30 September 1980. The aim of the operation was to identify Welsh Nationalists responsible for burning second homes with English owners.

It has been criticised as a more generalised trawl of left and nationalist milieux within Wales.

References

See also
Meibion Glyndŵr

History of Wales
Tan, Operation
1979 in Wales
1980 in Wales
Welsh nationalism